Parson-naturalists were ministers of religion who also studied natural history. The archetypical parson-naturalist was a priest in the Church of England in charge of a country parish, who saw the study of science as an extension of his religious work. The philosophy entailed the belief that God, as the Creator of all things, wanted man to understand his Creations and thus to study them through scientific techniques. They often collected and preserved natural artefacts such as leaves, flowers, birds' eggs, birds, insects, and small mammals to classify and study. Some wrote books or kept nature diaries.

Parson-naturalists

See also
 List of Christian thinkers in science
 Science in the Age of Enlightenment

References

Bibliography
 

Parson-naturalists
Natural history
Christian priests
Parson-naturalists